Sibisa Airport  is an airport located in Ajibata, Toba Samosir, North Sumatra, Indonesia. The airport is located 10 kilometers from Parapat city, Lake Toba.

References

Airports in North Sumatra